Joseph Kelly Hawley (born October 22, 1988) is a former American football center who played for the Atlanta Falcons and the Tampa Bay Buccaneers of the National Football League (NFL). He was drafted by the Falcons with the 117th pick in the fourth round of the 2010 NFL Draft. He retired after becoming a free agent in March 2018.

Early years
Hawley attended Esperanza High School in Anaheim, California. He began playing football as a freshman, and in his senior year, was named MVP and Male Athlete of the Year. He was a three-year letter winner and received Prep Star All West Region Honors.  He was regarded as a three-star recruit by Rivals.com.

Hawley recorded a school record 48 decleats as the Aztecs racked up an astounding 5,535 yards rushing, 7th most in California history, en route to the Division 1 CIF Championship game in 2005.  He played in the Cali-Florida Bowl and the Orange County and LA Shriners All-Star games in 2006.  Joe was Sunset League Offensive Lineman of the Year in 2004 and 2005; All-State Underclass, CalHiSports in 2004; All-State, First-team, CalHiSports in 2005; LA Times All-Star, First-team, in 2004 and 2005; All-Orange County, First-team, OC Register in 2004 and 2005; All-CIF Southern Section, All Divisions, First-team in 2005; and, All-CIF Southern Section, Division 1, First-team in 2004 and 2005.

Professional career

Atlanta Falcons
Hawley was drafted in the fourth round of the 2010 NFL Draft by the Atlanta Falcons. On September 7, 2015, he was released by the Falcons.

Tampa Bay Buccaneers
On September 14, 2015, Hawley was signed by the Tampa Bay Buccaneers.

On March 15, 2017, Hawley signed a two-year contract with the Buccaneers. During 2017, the team moved Ali Marpet to center from his original guard position, replacing Hawley.

On February 26, 2018, the Buccaneers declined the second-year option on Hawley's contract, making him a free agent in 2018.

Retirement
Hawley spent eight years in the NFL and retired after becoming a free agent in 2018 to pursue a passion project. He donated most of his belongings to Metropolitan Ministries of Tampa Bay and planned to live out of a custom 2007 Ford E-350 diesel cargo van as he explores the country with his rescue dog named Freedom. He departed the Tampa Bay area on April 5, 2018 to document his journey on YouTube, Instagram, and Twitter using the handle "ManVanDogBlog".

References

External links
Atlanta Falcons bio
 Tampa Bay Buccaneers bio
UNLV Rebels bio
Joe Hawley's Instagram Blog
Joe Hawley's YouTube Channel

1988 births
Living people
American football centers
American football offensive guards
UNLV Rebels football players
Atlanta Falcons players
Tampa Bay Buccaneers players
Players of American football from Anaheim, California
Players of American football from Bakersfield, California